Constituent Assembly elections were held in East Timor on 30 August 2001, the second anniversary of the independence referendum. One member was elected from each of the country's thirteen districts, whilst a further 75 were elected by proportional representation. The result was a victory for Fretilin, which won 55 of the 88 seats. Voter turnout was 93%. Following the election the Constituent Assembly nominated a transitional Council of Ministers with Mari Alkatiri as Chief Minister.

Background 
The elections were held to elect 88 members of a constituent assembly (the precursor of the National Parliament), which would be in charge of drafting the first constitution of the Asian country. These were the first free and fair elections to take place on Timorese territory in its entire history after the end of the Portuguese colonial period and the occupation by Indonesia (1975-1999). The elections were managed by the United Nations Transitional Administration in East Timor (UNTAET) to begin the second phase of the transition to full independence, after most of the Timorese infrastructure was destroyed by pro-Indonesian militias following the August 1999 independence referendum. 

Of the 88 seats in the Constituent Assembly, 13 would be elected by uninominal majority vote in representation of the thirteen districts that make up the country, while the remaining 75 would be elected by proportional representation by lists. Seventeen parties presented lists for the election.

Results

Aftermath
The Constituent Assembly was installed and invested a local autonomous government on 20 September led by a Council of Ministers, the first elected government in the country's history. Fretilin's Secretary General, Mari Alkatiri, took over as President of the Council of Ministers in coalition with the PD, with a two-thirds majority. On 20 May 2002 the United Nations protectorate came to an end and the territory became independent as the Democratic Republic of East Timor. The Constituent Assembly was reconstituted as the National Parliament, and the government of Alkatiri (who changed his position to Prime Minister) became the first constitutional government.

The Assembly had the mandate of preparing a constitution. It had to be approved by at least 60 of the 88 members within 90 days of the Assembly's first sitting. The new constitution was promulgated in March 2002, and following independence on 20 May, served as its first Parliament. Presidential elections were held in April 2002 in which Xanana Gusmão was victorious.

See also
List of members of the parliament of East Timor, 2001–07

References

External links

Elections in East Timor
East Timor
Parliamentary
East Timor